P. K. Gopi is an Indian poet writing in the language Malayalam and also a physiotherapist. He is a lyricist for Malayalam films and was a member of Kerala Sahitya Akademi. He was the former state president of Yuvakalasahithi.

He is the author of more than 27 Malayalam  books in the streams of poetry, memoirs and children's literature. He also penned for 30 Malayalam films.

Biography

P.K.Gopi was born in Koduman-Angadikkal village in Pathanamthitta District of Kerala on 8 June 1949. His father is P.K. Kunjupillai and mother, Kalyani. He completed his schooling from Angadikkal S.N.V.High School. He also studied at Pathanapuram St. Stephens college and Velloor Christian Medical College. He retired from Government Service as a Physiotherapist. He won the Jesees award given for the best govt employee. His songs have been part of many professional dramas/serials/documentaries /stage performances in Malayalam. His poems have been translated into English and other Indian languages. 

In 2018 Gopi received the Kendra Sahitya Akademi Award for Children's Literature award for his collection of memoirs/stories, Olachoottinte Velicham.

Notable works

 Chiranthanam
 Ezhuthamma
 Sudarshanappakshiyude thooval
Ayirathirandamathe Rathri
 Sushumnayile Sangeetham
 Marubhoomiyile mazhaganitham
 Mazhathottam
 Orittu
Thanal maram
Mankudam
Oppu
Harisree
Malayalappookkal
Neru
Chimizhu
Kuruvikkoodu
Arivum Murivum
Pattam
Muthumozhikal
Kiliyamma
Eekam
Nenjile Mancherathukal
Oolachoottinte Velicham
 Novinte Sangeetham
 Swaathanthryathinte Chirakukal
 Puzha thanna  pusthakam

Film lyrics
He has written lyrics for the following Malayalam films. 
Dhanam
Shubhayathra
Peruvannapurathe Visheshangal
Sasneham
Mannadiyaar penninu chengotta chekkan
Ottayal pattalam
Anashvaram
Neelagiri
Bhoomika
Naaraayam
Mukthi
Thirumanassu
Oru Kochu Bhoomikilukkam
Kusruthi kaattu
Mattanchery 
Pacha manga

.

References

External links

 http://www.mathrubhumi.com/mobile/print-edition/india/kendra-sahithya-academy-award--1.2914751
 3.http://www.veethi.com/india-people/p._k._gopi-profile-4806-25.htm
 http://en.msidb.org/songs.php?lyricist=PK%20Gopi&tag=Search&limit=79
 http://news.webindia123.com/news/articles/India/20160720/2903360.html
 https://www.mathrubhumi.com/literature/news/writer-pk-gopi-against-k-rail-1.7508823

Malayalam-language lyricists
Indian male songwriters
Malayalam poets
Living people
1949 births
Film musicians from Kerala
People from Pathanamthitta
Poets from Kerala
20th-century Indian musicians
20th-century Indian poets
20th-century Indian male writers
20th-century male musicians